Nathaniel Greene (1797–1877) was an American journalist.

Biography
Nathaniel Greene was born in Boscawen, New Hampshire on May 20, 1797. He became an apprentice in the office of the New Hampshire Patriot in 1809 and in 1812 edited the Concord Gazette.  In 1814 moved to Portsmouth, where he had charge of the New Hampshire Gazette. After this he settled in Haverhill, Massachusetts, and for two years managed the Haverhill Gazette. In May, 1817, he founded and edited the Essex Patriot, with which journal he remained connected until 1821, when he was invited to Boston and there founded the Statesman, a prominent Democratic organ.  He was for 15 years postmaster of Boston.

He published several translations:
 Sforzosi's History of Italy (1836)
 Tales from the German (1837)
 Tales and Sketches, Translated from the Italian, French and German (1843)
 Improvisations and Translations (1852)

From 1849 until 1861, he resided in Paris, and on his return settled in Boston. He contributed more than two hundred poems to various Boston journals, which appeared over the pen name of "Boscawen".

He died in Boston on November 29, 1877.

Family
His brother was Charles Gordon Greene, also a noted journalist. Nathaniel and his wife Susan Batchelder had a son, William Batchelder Greene, who was a noted author and abolitionist.

References

External links
 
 

American newspaper editors
Writers from Boston
1797 births
1877 deaths
People from Boscawen, New Hampshire
19th-century American translators
Burials at Mount Auburn Cemetery